Flavius Rufus (floruit 457 AD) was a politician of the Eastern Roman Empire. In 457 he was appointed consul with Constantinus as colleague; both of them were recognised only in the East.

Nothing else is known about him.

Sources 

 Jones, Arnold Hugh Martin, John Robert Martindale, John Morris, "Fl. Rufus 4", Prosopography of the Later Roman Empire, Volume 2, Cambridge University Press, 1992, p. 959.

5th-century Byzantine people
Imperial Roman consuls